The 1991–92 NBA season was the Hawks' 43rd season in the National Basketball Association, and 24th season in Atlanta. The Hawks had the ninth pick in the 1991 NBA draft, and selected Stacey Augmon out of UNLV. During the off-season, the team acquired All-Star guard Maurice Cheeks from the New York Knicks, acquired second-year guard Travis Mays from the Sacramento Kings, and acquired Blair Rasmussen from the Denver Nuggets. However, Mays only played just two games due to two ruptured tendons in his right ankle. The Hawks got off to an 8–8 start and played .500 basketball for the first half of the season, holding a 24–23 record at the All-Star break. However, with a 22–20 record as of January 28, Dominique Wilkins ruptured his Achilles tendon and was out for the remainder of the season after playing just 42 games, averaging 28.1 points and 7.0 rebounds per game. Without Wilkins, the Hawks would struggle and lose 24 of their final 40 games, including a 7-game losing streak in March. The Hawks finished fifth in the Central Division with a 38–44 record, missing the playoffs and losing a tie-breaker for the #8 seed in the Eastern Conference to the Miami Heat.

Wilkins and Kevin Willis were both selected for the 1992 NBA All-Star Game, but Wilkins did not participate due to injury. Willis averaged 18.3 points and 15.5 rebounds per game, was named to the All-NBA Third Team, and finished in third place in Most Improved Player voting. In addition, Augmon averaged 13.3 points and 1.5 steals per game, and was named to the NBA All-Rookie First Team, while second-year guard Rumeal Robinson showed improvement averaging 13.0 points and 5.5 assists per game, and Rasmussen provided the team with 9.0 points and 4.9 rebounds per game. Off the bench, Duane Ferrell provided with 12.7 points per game, and rookie guard Paul Graham contributed 10.1 points per game.

Following the season, Robinson was traded to the New Jersey Nets, and Cheeks was released to free agency after just one season with the Hawks.

Draft picks

Roster

Regular season

Season standings

y - clinched division title
x - clinched playoff spot

z - clinched division title
y - clinched division title
x - clinched playoff spot

Record vs. opponents

Game log

Player statistics

Season

Player Statistics Citation:

Awards
 Kevin Willis, All-NBA Third Team
 Stacey Augmon, NBA All-Rookie Team 1st Team

Transactions

References

See also
 1991–92 NBA season

Atlanta Hawks seasons
Atlanta Haw
Atlanta Haw
Atlanta Hawks